Abdul Latif (1927 – 27 February 2005) was a Bangladeshi singer, musician, and lyricist.  He was the initial composer of the Bengali language movement song, "Amaar Bhaiyer Rakte Rangano Ekushey February". He was awarded Ekushey Padak in 1997 and Independence Day Award in 2002 by the Government of Bangladesh.

Early life
Latif was born at Raipasha village in Barisal Sadar. After matriculating from Ruphshahya High School, he went to Kolkata for higher education. He started singing for the Congress Literature Group from the age of 16.

Career
He moved to Dhaka in July 1948 and joined Radio Pakistan as a staff artiste. He started writing songs since then. He wrote over 1500 songs. Latif was a government officer in various capacities from 1974 to 1993.

In 1953, first Latif composed the song Amar Bhaier Rokte Rangano, written by Abdul Gaffar Choudhury which is later re-composed to the current form by Altaf Mahmud. He wrote songs like Ora Amar Mukher Kotha, Ami dam diye kinechi Bangla and Shona Shona Shona Lokey Boley Shona.

Bibliography
His publications include Duare Aishachhe Palki from Bangladesh Folklore Parishad, Bhashar Gaan, Desher Gaan from Bangla Academy and Dilrobab from Islamic Foundation.

Awards
 Ekushey Padak (1997)
 Independence Day Award (2002)

References

20th-century Bangladeshi male singers
20th-century Bangladeshi singers
Recipients of the Ekushey Padak in arts
Recipients of the Independence Day Award
2005 deaths
1927 births
Burials at Mirpur Martyred Intellectual Graveyard
Meril-Prothom Alo Lifetime Achievement Award winners